Castanopsis javanica, the Javan chestnut-oak, is a tree in the beech family Fagaceae. The specific epithet  is from the Latin, meaning "of Java".

Description
The brown bark is smooth or scaly.

Distribution and habitat
Castanopsis javanica grows naturally in Thailand, Borneo, Java, Peninsular Malaysia and Sumatra. Its habitat is hill dipterocarp forests up to  altitude.

Uses
The wood is locally used in construction. The bark can be used in tanning. The nuts are considered edible.

References

javanica
Trees of Thailand
Trees of Borneo
Trees of Java
Trees of Peninsular Malaysia
Trees of Sumatra
Plants described in 1824
Flora of the Borneo lowland rain forests